Paul C. Spedero Jr. (born 1968) is a United States Navy rear admiral and naval aviator who serves as the commander of Carrier Strike Group 8 since May 31, 2022. He most recently served as commander of the Joint Enabling Capabilities Command from July 9, 2021 to May 23, 2022, and prior to that as director for fleet integrated readiness and analysis on the staff of the United States Fleet Forces Command.

He was promoted to his present rank on September 1, 2019.

A native of Springfield, Massachusetts, Spedero earned his commission from the NROTC program in Rensselaer Polytechnic Institute in 1990 with a B.S. degree in mechanical engineering, and was designated a naval aviator in 1992. He earned an M.A. degree in National Security and Strategic Studies from the Naval War College, an M.S. degree in Engineering Management from Old Dominion University, and a degree in French from the Defense Language Institute.

In February 2023, he was nominated for promotion to rear admiral and assignment as vice director for operations of the Joint Staff.

References

Living people
1968 births
People from Springfield, Massachusetts
Military personnel from Massachusetts
Rensselaer Polytechnic Institute alumni
Naval War College alumni
Old Dominion University alumni
Defense Language Institute alumni
Recipients of the Legion of Merit
United States Naval Aviators
United States Navy rear admirals (lower half)